Alan Blackshaw OBE (7 April 1933 – 4 August 2011) was an English mountaineer, skier and civil servant who was President of the Alpine Club from 2001 to 2004 and President of the Ski Club of Great Britain from 1997 to 2003.

Early life
Blackshaw was born in Liverpool and was educated at Merchant Taylors' School, Crosby (as a foundation Scholar) 1944–1951, and at Wadham College, Oxford (where he was an Open Scholar), 1951–54, and took a degree in Modern History.

Mountaineer and skier
In the 1950s he climbed in the Alps, making ascents of the north-east face of Piz Badile, the north face of the Aiguille du Triolet, and the south face of Pointe Gugliermina. Expeditions outside Europe include the Caucasus, Greenland and the Garwhal Himalaya.   

In 1972, he made a continuous ski traverse of the Alps from Kaprun to Gap, and between 1973 and 1978 he likewise traversed Scandinavia by ski, from Lakselv to Adneram.

In 1965, he published the handbook Mountaineering: From Hill Walking to Alpine Climbing.

1973–1976: President, British Mountaineering Council (Patron since 1978)
1985–1997: Chairman of Committee for Plas y Brenin, Sports Council National Mountain Centre, North Wales
1985–1988: Chairman, British Ski Federation
1991–1994: Chairman, Scottish National Ski Council (and President, 1994–2000)
1997–2003: President, Ski Club of Great Britain
2001–2004: President, Alpine Club
2004–2005: President, International Climbing and Mountaineering Federation (UIAA)

Career summary
1954–1956:  42 Royal Marines Commando, Cliff Assault Wing (officer instructor)
1956–1974: Royal Marines Reserve (mountain warfare instructor)
1956–1979: Civil service
1965–1967: First Secretary, Diplomatic Service, with UK Delegation to OECD, Paris
1967–1970: Principal Private Secretary to three Ministers of Power
1971–1972: Head of Home Branch, Iron and Steel division
1972–1974: Seconded to Charterhouse Bank in the City of London
1974–1978: Under-Secretary and later Director-General, Offshore Supplies Office, Member of Scottish Council for Development and Industry, Offshore Energy Technology Board, and Ship and Marine Technology Requirements Board
1978–1979: Under Secretary, Coal division, London
1979–2007: Management consultant with Strategy International Limited and Oakwood Environmental Limited
1990–1995: Board Member, Scottish Sports Council
1991–1997: Board Member, Scottish Natural Heritage
1998– : Member of Cairngorms Partnership Board

References

alanblackshaw.com

1933 births
2011 deaths
Alumni of Wadham College, Oxford
Civil servants in the Ministry of Power
English civil servants
English mountain climbers
Officers of the Order of the British Empire
People educated at Merchant Taylors' Boys' School, Crosby
Presidents of the Alpine Club (UK)
Royal Marines Commando officers
Military personnel from Liverpool